Leão (Portuguese for lion) may refer to:

 Émerson Leão (born 1949), Brazilian manager and former footballer
 Nara Leão (1942–1989), Brazilian bossa nova and MPB (popular Brazilian music) singer and occasional actress
 Aristides Leão (1914–1993), Brazilian biologist and scientist
 André Leão (born 1985), Portuguese footballer
 Augusto Pinto Duarte Maia (born 1971), Portuguese footballer known as Leão
 Rafael Alexandre da Conceição Leão (born 1999), Portuguese footballer

Portuguese-language surnames